UFC 147: Silva vs. Franklin II was a mixed martial arts  pay-per-view event held by the Ultimate Fighting Championship on June 23, 2012 at Mineirinho Arena in Belo Horizonte, Brazil.

Background

The finals in the featherweight and middleweight tournaments of The Ultimate Fighter: Brazil were held on this card.  Daniel Sarafian was originally scheduled to compete in the Middleweight finals, but pulled out due to injury.  He was replaced by semifinalist Sérgio Moraes. Renee Forte, a Middleweight for Team Wanderlei, was scheduled to fight Moraes, but was removed from the card when Moraes was enlisted to fill in for Sarafian. UFC Officials have promised Forte a fight on a future UFC card.

This event also saw other significant changes to its original card. The expected rematch between Anderson Silva and Chael Sonnen was moved to UFC 148 on July 7, 2012 in Las Vegas, Nevada and the expected co-feature of the Brazilian event, a rematch between Vitor Belfort and Wanderlei Silva was to headline the event.  On April 24, the changes regarding Silva/Sonnen were confirmed. Plans were then being made for Featherweight champion José Aldo, who was scheduled to defend his title at UFC 149, to headline this event. However, it was reported April 28, 2012, that Aldo would remain on the UFC 149 card and defend his title against Erik Koch.

On May 26, Vitor Belfort was forced to pull out of the card after breaking his left hand while training. Silva's opponent was changed to Rich Franklin in a 190 lb catchweight bout. Franklin and Silva faced each other previously in June 2009 at UFC 99, where Franklin defeated Silva via unanimous decision in a bout the earned both participants Fight of the Night honors.

Due to the multitude of changes to the main card, the UFC offered a full refund for any ticket-holder no longer wanting to see the event live. This is the first time in the promotion's history that a full refund for an event has been offered before the event took place, and the window for receiving the refund was only three days: 18 June 2012 to 20 June 2012.

Results

Bonus Awards
Fighters were awarded $65,000.
 Fight of the Night: Wanderlei Silva vs. Rich Franklin
 Knockout of the Night: Marcos Vinicius
 Submission of the Night: Rodrigo Damm

See also
List of UFC events
2012 in UFC

References

External links
 Official UFC past events page
 UFC events results at Sherdog.com

Ultimate Fighting Championship events
2012 in mixed martial arts
Mixed martial arts in Brazil
Sport in Belo Horizonte
2012 in Brazilian sport